Clem Curtis (born Curtis Clements; 28 November 1940 – 27 March 2017) was a Trinidadian British singer, who was the original lead vocalist of sixties soul group The Foundations.

Background

Family
He was the father of seven children, six sons and a daughter from previous relationships.

Early years

Born in Trinidad as Curtis Clements, he arrived in England at the age of fifteen and later found employment as an interior decorator. He entered boxing and won most of his fights as a professional boxer. His mother was a popular singer in Trinidad and Curtis claims that this contributed to his ear for music.

Between 1966 and 1967 Curtis joined The Ramong Sound. He joined the group after hearing from his uncle that Ramong, Raymond Morrison, the lead singer of the group, was looking for backing singers. Curtis initially had very limited singing experience, only singing with his uncle when he came around the house with the guitar. After losing their original lead singer, the band took on board Arthur Brown temporarily, and went through a few name changes before they became The Foundations Arthur Brown stated in an interview that in his time with the group, he enjoyed singing with Curtis. They both sang separately as well as doing some duets. The group emerged in January 1967 with Curtis as their lead singer. The Foundations would go on to have worldwide hits with "Baby Now That I've Found You" and "Build Me Up Buttercup". Curtis is the lead voice on their hits "Baby Now That I've Found You", "Back on My Feet Again", and "Any Old Time (You're Lonely and Sad)".

After having found success with The Foundations, two hit singles and releasing two albums, some problems started with their songwriter producer Tony Macaulay as well within the group. Curtis felt that after their hit a couple of The Foundations members were taking things a little too easy thinking that they did not need to work so hard now that they had scored a hit. After being disillusioned with the band, he along with another member, Mike Elliott, left The Foundations in 1968 just after recording a version of "It's All Right", a song that they had been playing live for some time. He stuck around long enough to help the band audition a replacement, Colin Young. Curtis went on to pursue a solo career in the United States. This was probably helped along by the encouragement of his friend Sammy Davis Jr.

In 1969 he was signed to Cowsills Productions and had a debut single with "Marie Take A Chance".

1970s to 2017
After some well-received club appearances and hanging out with artists such as Wilson Pickett, and staying with The Cowsills, he did not receive enough work and decided to return to England in the early 1970s. He did some work with Donnie Elbert and Johnny Johnson and the Bandwagon and later reformed a version of The Foundations.

Over the years, Curtis fronted various line-ups of The Foundations, as well as appearing on his own as a solo artist. He recorded and released records on various record labels, including EMI, Opium, Pye Records, RCA Records, Riverdale, and others. In 1977 Clem Curtis and The Foundations nearly got into the Eurovision final with "Where Were You When I Needed Your Love", a John Macleod and Dave Meyers composition. They came third in the heats, and were picked as a favourite to win, but an electricians' strike ruined their chances, and "Rock Bottom" by Lynsey de Paul and Mike Moran was the winner.

In the late 1980s, Curtis joined the line-up of "The Corporation", also referred to as "the Traveling Wrinklies", which was a parody of sorts of the popular Traveling Wilburys. The Traveling Wrinklies were composed of Curtis, Mike Pender, Brian Poole, Tony Crane, and Reg Presley, former lead singer of The Troggs. They released a single "Ain't Nothing But A House Party" on the Corporation label in 1988.

In the late 1980s, Curtis teamed up with original Foundations guitarist Alan Warner to re-cut the original Foundations hits.

Curtis appeared on stage as the Lion in The Wiz at the Lyric Hammersmith, and gave a successful gospel stage performance in Amen Corner at The Lyric in Shaftesbury Avenue. He has also appeared on TV chat shows, the British reality television series Airport, and had a bit part in the ITV series The Bill.

In 2004 Curtis toured the UK as part of a soul package tour with Jimmy James & The Vagabonds. At the end of a show he was invited back on stage by Jimmy James who said "I don't like him and he don't like me but that's all right. Here's Clem Curtis." They then did "Love Train" together.

Curtis recorded and performed until near the end of his life; he was regularly seen as part of the "soul explosion" night with former Flirtations singer Earnestine Pearce and Jimmy James at resorts such as Butlins and Warner Leisure Hotels in the United Kingdom. He also appeared on cruises such as the cruise ship "Azura", which docked in Southampton.

Curtis died on 27 March 2017 at the age of 76, after a short battle with cancer.

Curtis has been referred to on various occasions, informally as "The Godfather of English Soul".

Partial discography

References

External links
 Interview with Clem Curtis
 My-generation.org.uk
 Biography at music.msn.com

1940 births
2017 deaths
Trinidad and Tobago emigrants to the United Kingdom
20th-century Black British male singers
English soul singers
English male stage actors
English male television actors
People from Olney, Buckinghamshire
The Foundations members
21st-century Black British male singers
Pye Records artists
RCA Records artists
EMI Records artists
The Corporation (English band) members
Acid Jazz Records artists